"I'm Gonna Love You Just a Little More Baby" is a song written, produced and recorded by Barry White.

Released in the spring of 1973 as the first single from his 1973 debut album I've Got So Much to Give, the song was a number-one hit on the US R&B chart for two weeks, peaked at number three on the Billboard Pop Singles chart and reached number 23 on the UK Singles Chart.  The single was also certified gold by the RIAA for sales of one million copies.

Background

White recorded three song demos of himself singing and playing the piano, and he told his business partner Larry Nunes about the song, who convinced White to re-record and release it. Appearing with White on the recording session for the song were guitarists Ray Parker Jr., Wah Wah Watson, Dean Parks, and David T. Walker; drummer Ed Greene; bassists Wilton Felder and Nathan East; and vibes player Gary Coleman.

Reception
The single earned the gold certification (500,000 units sold) from the Recording Industry Association of America on June 6, 1973. Food writer Adrian Miller in his 2013 book Soul Food declared the song as his "personal choice" of songs by Barry White whenever a hot sauce, which Miller said "is about seduction", would come to mind.

Usage in the media
In 2020, Summer Walker recorded a cover of the song for Birds of Prey: The Album. Additionally, the Barry White version appears in the film. The song also appears in an episode of Friends and has appeared in several films and comedy sketches involving seductive or sexual scenes.

Charts

Weekly charts

Year-end charts

Other versions
In 1974, reggae artist Lloyd Charmers released a cover version in the UK on Trojan Records' subsidiary label Harry J (catalogue number HJ6662).

References 

1973 songs
1973 singles
Barry White songs
Songs written by Barry White
20th Century Fox Records singles